Rumney Rugby Football Club is a Welsh rugby union based in Rumney, Wales. Rumney RFC presently compete in the Welsh Rugby Union Division One East league.

Rumney were promoted to the Division One East league after finishing second in the Division Two East league in the 2006/07 season.

2010/2011 Mini & Junior

Under 8s, 9's, 10's, 11's, 12's, 13's, 14's, 15's, 16's

2010/2011 Youth & Open Age

Rumney RFC Firsts - WRU Division One East

Rumney RFC Seconds - WRU Reserve League

Rumney RFC Youth - Blues Premier

Club honours
 1994-95 Welsh League Division 5 - Champions

Notable past players

 Phil Ford - Wales and Great Britain rugby league international
 Steve Ford - Wales international
 Lloyd White - Crusaders & Wales rugby league international
 Lewis Mills - South Wales Scorpions & Wales rugby league international 
 Lewis Reece - South Wales Scorpions & Wales rugby league international
 Jamie Roberts - Cardiff Blues & Wales rugby union international
Gareth Delve

References

Welsh rugby union teams